This is the list of Estonian-language musicals. The list is incomplete.

See also
 List of Estonian plays

References

Musicals
Lists of musicals
Musicals